Simone Prince Alessio (born 14 April 2000) is an Italian taekwondo athlete.

Career 

Alessio won the gold medal at the 2019 World Taekwondo Championships in the men's lightweight competition. He qualified for the 2020 Summer Olympics through the 2021 European Taekwondo Olympic Qualification Tournament.

References

External links
 

2000 births
Italian male taekwondo practitioners
Living people
World Taekwondo Championships medalists
Taekwondo practitioners at the 2020 Summer Olympics
Olympic taekwondo practitioners of Italy
21st-century Italian people